The Communauté de communes Vallées et Châteaux (before 2010: Communauté de communes de la Région du Châtelet-en-Brie) is a former federation of municipalities (communauté de communes) in the Seine-et-Marne department in the Île-de-France region of France. Created in 1973, its seat was in Le Châtelet-en-Brie. It was dissolved in January 2017 when most of its communes joined the new Communauté de communes de la Brie des Rivières et Châteaux.

Composition 
The Communauté de communes de la Région du Châtelet-en-Brie included 13 communes:
Blandy
Le Châtelet-en-Brie
Châtillon-la-Borde
Crisenoy
Échouboulains
Les Écrennes
Féricy
Machault
Maincy
Moisenay
Pamfou
Sivry-Courtry
Valence-en-Brie

See also
Communes of the Seine-et-Marne department

References

Vallees et Chateaux